The Men's road race of the 2014 UCI Road World Championships was a cycling event that took place on 28 September 2014 in Ponferrada, Spain. It was the 81st edition of the championship, and Portugal's Rui Costa was the defending champion.

After attacking with around  remaining, Poland's Michał Kwiatkowski held off the rest of the field to become his country's first world road race champion. Kwiatkowski held on by a second to beat Australia's Simon Gerrans, while Spain's Alejandro Valverde finished in third place for the third successive world championships.

Qualification

Qualification was based on performances on the UCI run tours during 2014. Results from January to the middle of August counted towards the qualification criteria on both the 2014 UCI World Tour and the UCI Continental Circuits across the world, with the rankings being determined upon the release of the numerous tour rankings on 15 August 2014.

The following 48 nations qualified.

Course
The race was held on the same circuit as the other road races and consisted of 14 laps.

The first  were flat, after which the climb to Alto de Montearenas started, with an average gradient of 8%. After a few hundred metres the ascent flattened and the remaining  were at an average gradient of 3.5%. Next was a descent, with the steepest point after  at a 16% negative gradient.

Schedule
All times are in Central European Time (UTC+1).

Participating nations
204 cyclists from 44 nations started the men's road race. The numbers of cyclists per nation are shown in parentheses.

  Algeria (1)
  Argentina (3)
  Australia (9)
  Austria (6)
  Belgium (9)
  Belarus (3)
  Brazil (3)
  Canada (3)
  Colombia (9)
  Costa Rica (2)
  Croatia (3)
  Czech Republic (3)
  Denmark (6)
  Ecuador (1)
  Eritrea (2)
  Estonia (3)
  France (9)
  Great Britain (9)
  Germany (9)
  Greece (1)
  Ireland (3)
  Italy (9)
  Japan (3)
  Kazakhstan (3)
  Latvia (3)
  Lithuania (3)
  Luxembourg (1)
  Morocco (5)
  Netherlands (9)
  New Zealand (3)
  Norway (3)
  Poland (9)
  Portugal (6)
  Romania (3)
  Russia (6)
  Slovakia (3)
  Slovenia (6)
  South Africa (3)
  Spain (9) (host)
  Sweden (1)
  Switzerland (3)
  Ukraine (6)
  United States (6)
  Venezuela (4)

Prize money
The UCI assigned premiums for the top 3 finishers, with a total prize money of €16,101.

Results

Final classification

Riders who failed to finish
109 riders failed to finish the race.

References

External links
 Men's road race: The route

Men's road race
UCI Road World Championships – Men's road race
2014 in men's road cycling